Sir John Cotton, 3rd Baronet (1621 – 12 September 1702) was an English landowner and politician who sat in the House of Commons at various times between 1661 and 1687.

Early years
Cotton was the son of Sir Thomas Cotton, 2nd Baronet of Conington, Huntingdonshire, and his first wife Margaret Howard, daughter of Lord William Howard, of Naworth Castle, Cumberland. He became a gentleman of the Privy Chamber in 1661. He studied at Magdalen College, Oxford, matriculating in 1637.

Career
In 1661, Cotton was elected Member of Parliament for Huntingdon in the Cavalier Parliament. He succeeded to the baronetcy on the death of his father on 13 May 1662. In 1685 he was elected MP for Huntingdonshire.

Cotton died at the age of 80 at Stratton, Bedfordshire, and was buried at Conington where he has a monument.

Family
Cotton married firstly on 8 June 1644 Dorothy Anderson, daughter of Edmund Anderson, of Stratton and Eyworth and his wife Alice Constable, daughter of Sir John Constable, who was later Cotton's stepmother. He married secondly on 20 October 1658, at Mark's Hall, Essex, Elizabeth Honywood, daughter of Sir Thomas Honywood, of Mark's Hall, and his wife Hester Lamotte, daughter of John Lamotte, of London. Elizabeth's portrait was painted by Jacob Huysmans.

His eldest son John predeceased him, and the title passed to his grandson Sir John Cotton, 4th Baronet, of Connington. On the younger Sir John's death without issue, the title passed to his uncle Robert, his grandfather's son by Elizabeth Honywood.

References

1621 births
1702 deaths
Baronets in the Baronetage of England
English MPs 1661–1679
English MPs 1685–1687
English landowners
Members of the Parliament of England (pre-1707) for constituencies in Huntingdonshire